Izatha florida is a moth of the family Oecophoridae. It is endemic to New Zealand, where it is known from north-west Nelson.

The wingspan is 14.5–20 mm for males. Adults have been recorded in November and December.

References

Oecophorinae